The Kingston Frontenacs of the Eastern Professional Hockey League (EPHL) were a minor league professional ice hockey team affiliated with the NHL's Boston Bruins.

The team was based in Kingston, Ontario, and played home games at the Kingston Memorial Centre. The Frontenacs existed from 1959 until 1963, winning the final EPHL championship in 1962-63. The Frontenacs played in all four EPHL seasons, and was among the most stable of the league's franchises.  When the EPHL folded in 1963, the franchise was transferred to the new Central Hockey League as the Minneapolis Bruins.

Orval Tessier won two scoring titles with the Frontenacs, and voted the league's most valuable player and most sportsmanlike player in the 1961-62 season.

NHL alumni
List of Kingston Frontenacs alumni to play in the National Hockey League.

References

Ice hockey teams in Ontario
Defunct ice hockey teams in Canada
1959 establishments in Ontario
1963 disestablishments in Ontario
Ice hockey clubs established in 1959
Sports clubs disestablished in 1963
Boston Bruins minor league affiliates